The Europe Zone was one of the two regional zones of the 1954 Davis Cup.

23 teams entered the Europe Zone, with the winner going on to compete in the Inter-Zonal Final against the winner of the America Zone. Sweden defeated France in the final, and went on to face the United States in the Inter-Zonal Final.

Draw

First round

Hungary vs. New Zealand

Austria vs. Ireland

Finland vs. Norway

Netherlands vs. Spain

Egypt vs. Turkey

Monaco vs. Yugoslavia

Switzerland vs. Brazil

Second round

Luxembourg vs. Denmark

Hungary vs. West Germany

Austria vs. India

Norway vs. France

Spain vs. Italy

Egypt vs. Sweden

Belgium vs. Yugoslavia

Great Britain vs. Brazil

Quarterfinals

Denmark vs. Hungary

France vs. India

Sweden vs. Italy

Great Britain vs. Belgium

Semifinals

Denmark vs. France

Sweden vs. Belgium

Final

France vs. Sweden

References

External links
Davis Cup official website

Davis Cup Europe/Africa Zone
Europe Zone
Davis Cup